As a nickname, Hooks may refer to:

 Hooks Cotter (1900–1955), American Major League Baseball infielder
 Ray Dandridge (1913–1994), American Negro league infielder
 Hooks Dauss (1889–1963), American Major League Baseball pitcher
 Hooks Foreman (1895–1940), American Negro league catcher
 Hooks Iott (1919–1980), American Major League Baseball pitcher
 Hooks Warner (1894–1947), American Major League Baseball infielder
 Hooks Wiltse (1879–1959), American Major League Baseball pitcher

See also 

 Hook (nickname)

Lists of people by nickname